The Falconar Minihawk is a Canadian amateur-built aircraft, originally produced by Falconar Avia. The aircraft is supplied as a kit or plans for amateur construction.

Since the winding up of business by Falconar Avia in 2019, the plans are now sold by Manna Aviation.

Design and development
The aircraft features a cantilever low-wing, a two-seats-in-side-by-side configuration enclosed cockpit under a sliding canopy, fixed tricycle landing gear or, optionally, conventional landing gear, and a single engine in tractor configuration.

The Minihawk is made from wood, with its flying surfaces covered in doped aircraft fabric. Construction time from the supplied kit is estimated as 1500 hours.

Operational history
Even though a prototype was constructed, by November 2012 no examples were registered in its home country with Transport Canada.

Specifications (Minihawk)

See also
Mini-Hawk Tiger-Hawk - American aircraft with a similar name

References

External links
Official website

Homebuilt aircraft
Minihawk
Single-engined tractor aircraft
Low-wing aircraft